Chekurapadu is a village in Naguluppalapadu mandal of Prakasam district in Andhra Pradesh, India. Tobacco is one the major crops cultivated in the village.

References

Villages in Prakasam district